Todd Verow (born November 11, 1966) is an American film director who resides in New York City. He attended the Rhode Island School of Design and the AFI Conservatory. With his creative partner James Derek Dwyer, he formed Bangor Films in 1995. He was also the cinematographer for Jon Moritsugu's film Terminal USA (1993).  He has been called a veteran of the New Queer Cinema.

His numerous productions on digital video have led to his being called "once and future king of DV" by Film Threat. He is openly gay.

Filmography

References

External links
 
 Bangor Films (official website)

Living people
1966 births
Artists from Bangor, Maine
LGBT film directors
LGBT people from Maine
Film directors from Maine
Rhode Island School of Design alumni